Bunkka is the debut studio album by English electronic musician and producer Paul Oakenfold, released under the name Oakenfold. It was released in 2002 under the Maverick label.

It is also Oakenfold's best selling album to date, with sales exceeding 1,000,000 copies worldwide.

In response to how his dance-focused audience would react to the album, Oakenfold said "I hope they realise that in any forms of music you need to push the boundaries. I've been inspired by all kinds of music, from hip-hop to guitars to dance, and hopefully the dance audience will understand that." The album was released to mixed reviews.

Track listing 
 "Ready Steady Go" (featuring Asher D) – 4:13
 "Southern Sun" (featuring Carla Werner) – 6:57
 "Time of Your Life" (featuring Perry Farrell) – 4:17
 "Hypnotised" (featuring Tiff Lacey) – 6:34
 "Zoo York" (featuring Clint Mansell and Kronos Quartet) – 5:25
 "Nixon's Spirit" (featuring Hunter S. Thompson) – 2:48
 "Hold Your Hand" (featuring Emiliana Torrini) – 3:39
 "Starry Eyed Surprise" (featuring Shifty Shellshock of Crazy Town) – 3:48
 "Get Em Up" (featuring Ice Cube) – 3:50
 "Motion" (featuring Grant-Lee Phillips) – 6:24
 "The Harder They Come" (featuring Nelly Furtado and Tricky) – 3:50
 "Mortal" (Japanese bonus track also available on "The Harder They Come" single) – 6:42

Personnel 
 Paul Oakenfold – keyboards, programming, drums, production, mixing, vocal engineering
 Hunter S. Thompson – vocals, spoken word
 Emiliana Torrini – vocals
 Ice Cube – raps
 Tiff Lacey – vocals
 Asher D – raps
 Perry Farrell – vocals
 Nelly Furtado – vocals
 Tricky – vocals
 Carla Werner – vocals
 Shifty Shellshock – raps
 Grant Lee Phillips – vocals, background vocals, guitar
 Mark Ralph – guitar
 Phil Corderone – guitar ("Ready Steady Go" and "Nixon's Spirit")
 David Rhodes – guitar  ("Get Em Up")
 Emerson Swinford – guitar 
 Christian Twigg (Spymob) – bass guitar ("Ready Steady Go" and "Get Em Up")
 Jamie Muhoberac – keyboards
Additional personnel
 Steve Osborne – production, programming, mixing, vocal mixing
 Andy Gray – production, programming, engineering, mixing
 Carmen Rizzo – production, engineering, vocal engineering
 Jeff Turzo – production, mixing
 Ed Chadwick – assistant engineering
 Pete Davies – programming, engineering
 Chris Blair – mastering
 Anton Corbijn – photography

Song appearances 
 "Ready, Steady, Go", appears in a number of the films, video games and other media, including: The Bourne Identity, Stormbreaker and Collateral, Tiger Woods PGA Tour 2003, DDR Ultramix Juiced, Las Vegas, an ad campaign for Saab and an episode of the TV series ALIAS. Oakenfold produced a Korean style lyrical version of "Ready, Steady, Go" for the film Collateral.
 "Zoo York" (which features a sample of Clint Mansell's Winter: Lux Aeterna and Bally Sagoo's Qurbani Qurbani) was used in the trailers for the films Sunshine and Babylon A.D..
 "Starry Eyed Surprise" has been used in television commercials for Diet Coke.

Charts

References

External links 
 

2002 debut albums
Paul Oakenfold albums
Maverick Records albums